The Rev. Dell's Secret is a 1924 Australian silent film directed by P. J. Ramster. It is considered a lost film.

Plot
Reverend David Dell (Rex Simpson) does missionary work in the Sydney underworld. He comes across a young girl, Juanita (Joy Wood), who is forced to dance in a sleazy cabaret after the death of her mother by Nick Grummit, a man who pretends to be her father. Dell tries to save her, taking her to a good home. But Grummit and his men track her down and Dell is blinded by a bottle in a fight to save her. Dell is looked after an admirer, Joyce (Thelma Newling), while Juanita goes on to become a star ballerina. Joyce dies and Dell and is reunited with the reverend.

Cast
Rex Simpson as David Dell
Thelma Newling as Joyce
William Shepherd
Lyn Salter
Joy Wood as Juanita

Production
The film was shot on location in Sydney with cast largely drawn from Ramster's acting school.

References

External links

The Rev. Dell's Secret at National Film and Sound Archive

1924 films
Australian drama films
Australian silent feature films
Australian black-and-white films
Lost Australian films
1924 drama films
1924 lost films
Lost drama films
Silent drama films